Resident Evil: Damnation, known as  in Japan, is a 2012 Japanese adult computer-animated biopunk action film by Capcom and Sony Pictures Entertainment Japan, and is directed by Makoto Kamiya and produced by Hiroyuki Kobayashi. It features the voices of Matthew Mercer, Dave Wittenberg, Wendee Lee, and Courtenay Taylor.

The story revolves around CIA agent Leon S. Kennedy as he investigates biological weapons used in a European civil war. Kamiya aimed to tell a more original story by moving away from the narrative of the series, and asked for Capcom's aid in regards to the handling of the characters to make them consistent with their video game counterparts.

Damnation premiered on October 27, 2012, in Shinjuku, Tokyo. It was commercially successful, grossing more than $2 million in Japan and more than $3 million in home media format in the US. The film has an approval rating of 100% on review aggregation website Rotten Tomatoes.

Plot
In 2011, CIA agent Leon S. Kennedy enters a Eastern Slav Republic to confirm rumors that Bio-Organic Weapons (BOWs) are being used in the country's civil war, and ignores the government's order to retreat. He comes across his contact, who has been attacked and is then killed by a strong Licker. After a brief fight, second Licker appears but spares Leon, Leon is knocked out, strong lead Lickers are released in the wild, and finds himself tied to a chair by rebel fighters JD; the former teacher Alexander Kozachenko, better known as Buddy; and the elderly Ivan Judanovich, the group's Ataman.

President Svetlana Belikova meets agent Ada Wong, who is posing as a BSAA agent. Ada explains a human infected with the dominant Las Plagas parasite will have a brief master-slave relationship with lesser BOWs infected with the T-virus (Lickers Beta themselves). Elsewhere, Leon tries to warn the soldiers of Ivan's infection look, but Buddy starts a shoot-out. Buddy kills Ivan after being asked. Leon escapes and meets JD, only for Plaga hosts to attack them. JD leads Leon to a church, where they regroup with other rebels. JD helps Leon escape, urging him to stop Buddy, as he is obsessed with his hatred of the government, which bombed his school and killed his fiancée and students. Leon runs into Ada, who admits she is in the country to collect a sample of Las Plagas. She leaves and warns him the city will soon be bombed. Leon returns to the church to find Ganados have attacked it, killing the other rebels and infecting JD. After Buddy arrives, Leon kills JD. Leon then asks Buddy to give up Las Plagas, but he refuses and escapes when military jets bomb the church.

Svetlana exposes Ada as a fraud and captures her after a fight. Leon enters the bunker where Ada is held, and the two meet at the main hive control. When Svetlana and her army troops surround them, Ada releases a smoke bomb and escapes while Leon kills several soldiers. Buddy arrives and sends Lickers to attack the troops. Svetlana dispatches Tyrants to eliminate Leon, Buddy and the Lickers but they are defeated. Just as Svetlana prepares for her press conference, she is informed of a joint Russian and American invasion, which forces her to resign.

As Leon and Buddy watch the invasion, Buddy asks Leon to kill him before his Plaga takes control. Leon refuses, telling him to live to serve as the living memory of those who died and then shoots Buddy's spine, severing the Plaga's control over him. Afterwards, Leon speaks to Hunnigan about the mission, while elsewhere Ada speaks to her employer about a Las Plagas sample she retrieved, but does not make clear if she will hand it over or not.

Cast

Voice actors and motion capture actors for the characters are listed below:

Production
At the end of 2008, when Resident Evil: Degeneration was released, the producers talked about a possible sequel. As a result of Degenerations commercial success, Capcom and SPEJ decided to co-operate again to produce the sequel. Production for the sequel officially began in September 2010. The director is Makoto Kamiya, who often spoke with producer Hiroyuki Kobayashi due to his experience with the Resident Evil video games. The character models were created based on Capcom's input in Resident Evil 6, which was released shortly before the film. Leon's recurring appearances in the games and previous films led to him being the film's protagonist. The team received the Licker's CGI model from Capcom. However, the team created original creatures in order to make Damnation a more unique film. In order to make the film faithful to the series, Kamiya often consulted Capcom over how should characters interact. He found the CGI animation challenging, and described the film as a standalone, but still recommended fans to play certain games and watch Degeneration to understand the film better. Kamiya initially wanted Damnation to follow the dysfunctional romance between Leon and Ada, but the idea was scrapped. He stated that the film is meant to foreshadow elements of Resident Evil 6.

The film was produced with motion capture and 3D. Kobayashi spoke of the team's desire to make the CGI films as appealing as Hollywood films. Kobayashi had produced Resident Evil 4 and wanted to make a sequel to it. To contrast Claire's role from Degeneration, Ada Wong was picked as the returning heroine. The film features buddy elements but with focus on how more mature Leon is depicted. While there is focus on action, Kobayashi also introduced more horror elements. The inclusion of the Tyrants is meant to give the audience a shock due to how menacing he is. Another change in regards to the films is the handling of post-Soviet Russia rather than having another story set in North America.

Writer Shotaro Suga returned from writing Degenaration. He further elaborated on the romance between Leon and Ada was briefly explored in Resident Evil 4 and since both never met in Resident Evil 5, there might have been a time when the two met. For the film, Suga went to Eastern Europe and created the East Slavic Republic, a fictional post-Soviet country formed following the dissolution of the Soviet Union. The ending is meant to be a cliffhanger as the story is meant to continue in Resident Evil 6. In retrospect, Suga claims that Damnation surpassed Degeneration. The theme song by Anna Tsuchiya, "Carry On", is played during the credits.

Toshiyuki Morikawa returned to voice Leon in Japanese while Matthew Mercer dubbed in English. The latter had previously done the motion capture for Resident Evil 6 too but was replaced for the film by Kevin Dorman. Mercer elaborates the Leon from Damnation is a more "younger, cockier" character, and "actually follows his transition" in contrast to the "broken, downtrodden Leon that Resident Evil 6 begins with". Damnation was recorded over five days according to Mercer, which lasted longer than the video game. Mercer said the script was "pretty stringent, but we [the staff] were able to improvise a bit". Thanks to discussions with the director, Mercer was able to give his character more personality, linking him to Spider-Man, who also has a tendency to perform one-liners. He claimed that since some of Leon's enemies are silent, there was not a lot of opportunity to perform jokes. Courtenay Taylor, who plays Ada Wong, said that she felt pressure when voicing her character since it was her major debut as Operation Raccoon City was not popular, unlike Damnation and Resident Evil 6, and had more knowledge about the live-action films. Val Tasso said that JD was his most memorable work and said that he also did the motion capture unlike other actors, and said he enjoyed his character for the multiple facets the script gives him most notably when interacting with Leon despite their initial antagonism.

Release
The first trailer and first seven minutes of the film debuted in the panel discussion at the San Diego Comic-Con on July 13, 2012. The film was released theatrically in Shinjuku, Aichi, and Osaka on October 27, 2012.

Capcom and Sony Pictures released Damnation as a digital download on Xbox Live, Zune and PlayStation Network on September 15, 2012, and on DVD and Blu-ray on September 25, 2012. The Damnation bonus contents include an art gallery of conceptual sketches, a 7-minute short film about the creatures seen in the film, a 30-minute documentary about the making of the film, a 6-minute gag reel, and video game and film trailers (such as Resident Evil 6, DmC: Devil May Cry and Dragon's Dogma).

Reception
The film grossed  at the Japanese box office, with its debut week earning $666,837. In the United States, Resident Evil: Damnation has earned  in home video sales. In Japan, the DVD sold 24,952 units while the Blu-ray sold 23,917 units.

On review aggregator Rotten Tomatoes, 100% of 5 reviews are positive for the film, and the average rating is 8/10. Blu-ray.com found the story to be accessible to newcomers, and named Damnation as one of the faithful video game adaptations especially thanks to the characters' dynamics. IGN gave the film a score of 7.8 out of 10, named it "the best Resident Evil film to-date" but stated that there was a lack of accessibility for newcomers. Joel Harley from Starburst rated the film 7/10, and criticized the lack of introduction to the characters for viewers who are new to the series, though felt that fans of the franchise would enjoy the installment, the CGI of which allowed for compelling action sequences. Blu-ray.com was more positive, finding the story accessible to newcomers and naming Damnation as one of the faithful video game adaptations. Otaku USA found the premise confusing and noted that the relationship Leon has with Ada comes across underdeveloped while the horror elements are removed in the climax.

Reviewing the home media releases, the audio was commended by Blu-ray.com for evoking a battlefield and fitting into the setting due to the use of several weapon powers, while the various characters was stated to have "heavy Eastern Bloc accents" by DVD Talk, but "the crispness and clarity of the center channel will not leave [the viewer] scratching [their] head as to what was said." IGN said that the audio of the Blu-ray version was well presented along with the soundtrack. The Hollywood News commented that the animation was one of the major outstanding parts of the film for giving the enemy creatures horror-like looks.

In a retrospective article, Escapist Magazine wrote that Damnation was the best film in the entire franchise, citing a narrative similar to Resident Evil 4, and lauded the film for its accessibility, visuals, and action sequences. Looper gave Degeneration, Damnation and Vendetta the title of "Honorable Mention" when listing all Resident Evil movies as a result of the live-actions having generally been reviewed more than the CGI ones.

The film was awarded the 2013 International 3D Society Japan Award for animation.

Sequel
The film was followed by Resident Evil: Vendetta, which was released in 2017.

See also
 List of films based on video games

References

External links
 
  
 

2012 3D films
2012 horror films
2012 computer-animated films
Japanese adult animated films
Films set in Europe
Japanese 3D films
Damnation
Films about viral outbreaks
Japanese war films
2012 films
Japanese animated horror films
2012 anime films
Films set in 2011
Films set in a fictional country
Films set in the 2010s
Anime films based on video games
3D animated films
Japanese computer-animated films